The Frog Prince is a story recorded by the brothers Grimm.

The Frog Prince (or King) may also refer to:

Literature
The Frog King (novel), a 2002 romantic novel by Adam Davies

Film and TV
The Frog Prince (1984 film), a romantic comedy
The Frog Prince (1986 film), a Cannon Movie Tales film featuring Aileen Quinn
The Frog Prince (Mamet play), a play by David Mamet
Tales from Muppetland: The Frog Prince, a 1971 television special featuring Jim Henson's Muppets
"The Tale of the Frog Prince" (Faerie Tale Theatre episode), an episode of Faerie Tale Theatre starring Robin Williams and Teri Garr
The Prince Who Turns into a Frog, a 2005 Taiwanese idol drama

Music
Die Prinzen (German: The Princes), an a cappella group named after the frog
The Frog Prince, moniker of Taiwanese singer Frankie Kao
"The Frog Prince" (song), a 2006 song by English band Keane
The Frog Prince (album), the soundtrack album of a British film released in 1984, featuring Enya

See also
The Princess and the Frog (disambiguation)
The Frog Princess